Joseph Achille Le Bel (21 January 1847 in Pechelbronn – 6 August 1930, in Paris, France) was a French chemist. He is best known for his work in stereochemistry. Le Bel was educated at the École Polytechnique in Paris. In 1874 he announced his theory outlining the relationship between molecular structure and optical activity. This discovery laid the foundation of the science of stereochemistry, which deals with the spatial arrangement of atoms in molecules. This hypothesis was put forward in the same year by the Dutch physical chemist Jacobus Henricus van 't Hoff and is currently known as Le Bel–van't Hoff rule. Le Bel wrote Cosmologie Rationelle (Rational Cosmology) in 1929.

Works

See also
Hexamethylbenzene
Optical rotation

References

Royal Society of Chemistry obituary

1847 births
1930 deaths
19th-century French chemists
Members of the French Academy of Sciences
Foreign Members of the Royal Society
Stereochemists
People from Bas-Rhin